Mwenda is an African given name and surname. Notable people with the name include:

Andrew Mwenda (born 1972), Ugandan journalist
Jean Bosco Mwenda (1930–1990), Congolese guitar player
Mwenda Njoka, Kenyan investigative journalist
Dr. Mwenda, Zambian Professor.

Surnames of African origin
African given names